Alexeyevskaya is a rural locality (a village) in Boretskoye Rural Settlement of Vinogradovsky District, Arkhangelsk Oblast, Russia. The population was 11 as of 2010.

Geography 
Alexeyevskaya is located on the Tyoda River, 80 km southeast of Bereznik (the district's administrative centre) by road. Leushinskaya is the nearest rural locality.

References 

Rural localities in Vinogradovsky District